Paulele (foaled 7 October 2018) is a Group 1 winning Australian Thoroughbred racehorse.

Background

Paulele is a homebred of Godolphin by stallion Dawn Approach, who shuttled to Australia as a stallion between 2014 and 2018.
 
Paulele is one of seven winners bred from her dam, Chatoyant.  This makes Paulele a three-quarter brother to the 2013 Thoroughbred Breeders Stakes winner, Montsegur, and a half-brother to the 2016 Canonbury Stakes winner Tessera.

Racing career

As a two-year-old, Paulele raced on five occasions for three victories, culminating in his first stakes win in the 2021 Kindergarten Stakes at Randwick when ridden by Damien Oliver.  Oliver commented on the horse after the race stating, "He is a bit of a weapon this horse”.

At the age of three, Paulele was successful in the 2021 Roman Consul Stakes when ridden by James McDonald and the 2022 Eskimo Prince Stakes when ridden by Kerrin McEvoy.  Paulele would finish his three-year-old career with three minor placings at Group 1 level when running third in the T J Smith Stakes behind Nature Strip and second placings in the Doomben 10,000 and Kingsford-Smith Cup. 

As a four-year-old, Paulele won the 2022 Schillaci Stakes at Caulfield, before winning his first Group 1 in the Winterbottom Stakes, when he came from last on the turn in a field of sixteen, to win by a head margin.

Pedigree

References 

Racehorses bred in Australia
Racehorses trained in Australia
2018 racehorse births